Robert McLachlan (born 17 April 1971) is a professional road bicycle racer from Australia. The 1992 Olympian now rides for the Drapac Porsche Development Program and a two-time series champion of the UCI Oceania Tour. He was an Australian Institute of Sport scholarship holder.

Major results 

2004
 2nd, Australian National Cycling Championships - Road Race
2005 - MG XPower Presented by BigPond
 Champion, 2004–2005 UCI Oceania Tour
 Tour de Korea
 1st, Stage 3
 1st, Stage 6
 Champion, Tattersall's Cup Series
 Tour of Gippsland (Tattersall's Cup Series)
 1st, Criterium championship classification
 1st, Stage 3
 1st, Stage 7
 1st, Stage 8
 1st, Stage 9
 6th, Overall, Jayco Tour of Tasmania (Tattersall's Cup Series)
 1st, Stage 5
 1st, Stage 7
 2nd, Australian National Cycling Championships - Road Race
2006
 1st, Overall, Tour of Chong Ming
 1st, Melbourne to Warrnambool Classic
 Tour de Korea
 1st, Stage 2
 1st, Stage 6
2007 - Drapac Porsche Development Program
 Champion, 2006-2007 UCI Oceania Tour
 9th Overall, Bay Classic Series
 1st, Oceania Continental Cycling Championships - Road Race
 2nd, Australian National Cycling Championships - Road Race

References

External links
Team UniSA profile

1971 births
Living people
Australian male cyclists
Cyclists at the 1992 Summer Olympics
Olympic cyclists of Australia
Cyclists from New South Wales
Australian Institute of Sport cyclists